Omosarotes singularis is a species of beetle in the family Cerambycidae. It was described by Pascoe in 1860. It is known from Costa Rica, Brazil, Panama.

References

Cyrtinini
Beetles described in 1860